Krasnaya refers to:
Krasnaya River, Kaliningrad Oblast, Russia
Krasnaya River (Kazanka), Republic of Tatarstan, Russia
Krasnaya Sloboda, Azerbaijan
Krasnaya Hotel, hotel in Odesa, Ukraine
Krasnaya Plesen, Russian punk rock group
Krasnaya Zvezda, Russian newspaper

See also
Krasnaya Polyana (disambiguation)
Krasnaya Gorka (disambiguation)